Oath of Vengeance is a 1944 American Western film directed by Sam Newfield. Shot at Corriganville Movie Ranch, the film was released by Producers Releasing Corporation as one of the studio's Billy the Kid film series.

Plot
Fuzzy decides to give up the cowboy life after a calf he unsuccessfully hogtied gets her revenge by dragging Fuzzy through the prairie by his own lasso.  Fuzzy purchases a general store figuring by buying things low and selling things at a higher price he'll be rich. Fuzzy's dreams come to a long pause when he discovers all his customers purchase their goods by credit, paying them back when their harvests or cattle sales come through.  Adding to Fuzzy's woes are the fact that he shares his store with an angry postmistress.

Meanwhile, two villains see their chance to become rich by playing the cattlemen, led by female boss Dale Kirby, and the farmers represented by Dan Harper against each other.  The ensuing range war would benefit the pair with their buying the farmer's land when they are driven off and taking the proceeds of rustled cattle that the pair blame on the farmers.  Billy Carson sees their game and takes them on as well as the hostile cattlemen and farmers.

Cast 
 Buster Crabbe as Billy Carson
 Falcon as Billy's horse
 Al St. John as Fuzzy Q. Jones
 Mady Lawrence as Dale Kirby
 Jack Ingram as Steve Kinney
 Charles King as Henchman Mort
 Marin Sais as Ma, the Postmistress
 Karl Hackett as Dan Harper
 Kermit Maynard as Ranch Foreman Red
 Hal Price as Sheriff
 Frank Ellis as Kirby rider Vic

Quotes
Billy: You always do things the hard way, Fuzzy
Fuzzy: At least I get things done

See also
The "Billy the Kid" films starring Buster Crabbe: 
 Billy the Kid Wanted (1941)
 Billy the Kid's Round-Up (1941)
 Billy the Kid Trapped (1942)
 Billy the Kid's Smoking Guns (1942)
 Law and Order (1942) 
 Sheriff of Sage Valley (1942) 
 The Mysterious Rider (1942)
 The Kid Rides Again (1943)
 Fugitive of the Plains (1943)
 Western Cyclone (1943)
 Cattle Stampede (1943)
 The Renegade (1943)
 Blazing Frontier (1943)
 Devil Riders (1943)
 Frontier Outlaws (1944)
 Valley of Vengeance (1944)
 The Drifter (1944) 
 Fuzzy Settles Down (1944)
 Rustlers' Hideout (1944)
 Wild Horse Phantom (1944)
 Oath of Vengeance (1944)
 His Brother's Ghost (1945) 
 Thundering Gunslingers (1945)
 Shadows of Death (1945)
 Gangster's Den (1945)
 Stagecoach Outlaws (1945)
 Border Badmen (1945)
 Fighting Bill Carson (1945)
 Prairie Rustlers (1945) 
 Lightning Raiders (1945)
 Terrors on Horseback (1946)
 Gentlemen with Guns (1946)
 Ghost of Hidden Valley (1946)
 Prairie Badmen (1946)
 Overland Riders (1946)
 Outlaws of the Plains (1946)

External links 
 
 

1944 films
1944 Western (genre) films
American Western (genre) films
American black-and-white films
Billy the Kid (film series)
1940s English-language films
Producers Releasing Corporation films
Films directed by Sam Newfield
1940s American films